Weretā Tainui Pītama (1881 – 5 April 1930) was a New Zealand farmer, land claimant and trust board chairman. Of Māori descent, he identified with the Ngāi Tahu iwi. He was born in Rāpaki, North Canterbury, New Zealand, in 1881.

References

1881 births
1930 deaths
Ngāi Tahu people
People from Banks Peninsula
New Zealand Māori farmers
Māori politicians